Fr. Edward (Ned) Joseph Coyne S.J. (1896-1958) was a Jesuit priest, economist and sociologist. He founded the Catholic Workers' College (which became the College of Industrial Relations and National College of Ireland) in Milltown, Dublin, and served as its principal from 1951 to 1954.

Edward Coyne was born in Dublin on 20 June 1896, and educated at Clongowes Wood College and University College Dublin, where he studied History and Economics, gaining a first in both subjects.

Coyne served as Professor of Moral Theology at the Jesuit College in Milltown.

While formulating the 1937 Irish Constitution, Éamon de Valera was advised by Fr Coyne among others.

He served on a number of Government commissions and other organisations. He was Chairman of the Irish Agricultural Organisation Society.

Fr. Coyne died on 22 May 1958.

References 

Alumni of University College Dublin
20th-century Irish Jesuits
Irish educational theorists
1958 deaths
1896 births
20th-century Irish economists
Irish sociologists
Alumni of Milltown Institute of Theology and Philosophy
Presidents of the National College of Ireland